A que no me dejas, formerly known as A que no me dejas, corazón (English title: I Dare You to Leave), is a Mexican telenovela produced by Carlos Moreno for Televisa. It is a remake of the Mexican telenovela Amor en silencio, produced in 1988.

Production of A que no me dejas officially started on May 26, 2015 in Televisa San Ángel.

The series stars Camila Sodi as Paulina in the first part of the story and Valentina in the second part, Arturo Peniche, Cecilia Gabriela, Alejandra Barros, and Laura Carmine who appear in all episodes, Osvaldo Benavides as Adrián, Leticia Calderón as Inés, and Alfredo Adame as Alfonso in the first act and Erika Buenfil and César Évora and Ignacio Casano in the second act.

The series won seven awards at TVyNovelas Awards for Best Original Story or Adaptation, Best Direction and Best Direction of the Cameras. For its cast, Laura Carmine won for Best Antagonist Actress,  Leticia Calderón for Best Leading Actress, Arturo Peniche for Best Leading Actor; its theme song "A que no me dejas" performed by Alejandro Sanz received the award for Best Musical Theme.

Plot summary 
A story where despite obstacles and betrayals, love succeeds, if not in the present, at least in the future and its generations. This is a heartbreaking story where power, envy, selfishness and the desire for possession tragically mark the deep love between Paulina (Camila Sodi) and Adrián (Osvaldo Benavides), who nevertheless manage to perpetuate their love and pass it on to their daughter Valentina (Camila Sodi) and Paulina's adopted son, their beloved Mauricio (Ignacio Casano). This melodrama is divided in two stages; in each one of them are the obstacles where love, first of Paulina and Adrian and later of Valentina and Mauricio, triumphs.

First stage 
It is the story of Paulina and Adrián, a couple who love each other despite their families' dark past. Paulina is the daughter of Gonzalo Murat, a wealthy hotel entrepreneur who does not accept the relationship of his daughter with Adrián, with the reason that he does not have the same status as them. On the other hand, Julieta, Adrián's sister, is obsessed with him and blames Gonzalo for the death of her father; a situation that makes her feel a hatred for the entire Murat family. Julieta is right, Gonzalo is not the perfect man his wife, Inés, and his daughters Nuria and Paulina believe, since he is a man without a heart and double standards, because for more than ten years he has been having a relationship with Mónica, his former secretary with whom he also has two sons: René and Alan.

Nuria, sister of Paulina, join forces with Julieta to separate Paulina from Adrián. The multiple disagreements and misunderstandings caused by their rivals and enemies, cause Paulina and Adrián to be separated, not knowing that Paulina is pregnant.

Being away from Adrián, Camilo, an ex-boyfriend of Paulina, offers to take care and give his surname to the child. At the same time, Paulina decides to take charge of Mauricio, a deaf-mute child who adores Paulina and lives in the cover of the Murat family.

However, Adrián will return to the life of Paulina with the intention to win her love back. After they reconcile, they both decide to get married. On the joyous occasion, Julieta shows up, in order to murder Paulina, but instead shoots Adrián and Paulina. Sadly they both die in each other's arms, promising eternal love for one another.

Second stage 
It has been 17 years since the tragedy that changed the life of Mauricio and Valentina, who have grown apart all this time, but communicating continuously.
Valentina, who strongly resembles her mother physically, lives in Los Angeles along with Fernanda, her close friend, and Mauricio lives in Cancún, along with his grandmother Raquel.

Mauricio has been in love with Valentina since a child, and he will do everything possible to protect and care for her despite his disability and the obstacles that may arise.

Love is present in this story, as it was in the past, but the evil Nuria, who remains resentful and full of frustration, will do whatever in her power to get the fortune of her father. As well as the crazy Julieta, who is determined to repeat history and put an end to the life of Valentina and Mauricio, as she did in the past with Paulina and Adrián.

Episodes

Cast

Main 

 Camila Sodi as Paulina Murat/Valentina Olmedo
 Osvaldo Benavides as Adrián Olmedo
 Leticia Calderón as Inés Murat
 Arturo Peniche as Gonzalo Murat
 Alfredo Adame as Alfonso Fonseca
 Cecilia Gabriela as Raquel Fonseca
 Alejandra Barros as Julieta Olmedo
 Erika Buenfil as Angélica
 César Évora as Osvaldo
 Laura Carmine as Nuria Murat
 Lisset as Mónica Greepé
 Alfonso Dosal as Camilo Fonseca
 Odiseo Bichir as Édgar
 Socorro Bonilla as Micaela
 Moisés Arizmendi as Jaime Córdova
 Salvador Zerboni as Leonel
 Luis Fernando Peña as Beto
 Gabriela Zamora as Chelo
 Florencia de Saracho as Karen
 Ernesto D'Alessio as Darió Córdova
 Martha Julia as Ileana
 Maya Mishalska as Maite
 Ignacio Casano as Mauricio Fonseca 
 Brandon Peniche as René Greepe
 Juan Pablo Gil as Alan Greepe
 Ela Velden as Fernanda
 David Ostroky as Clemente
 Lenny de la Rosa as Alexis
 Adriano Zendejas as Tobías
 Jade Fraser as Carolina
 Jorge Gallegos as Félix
 Maricruz Nájera as Silvia

Recurring 

 Diego Escalona as Child Mauricio
 Fede Porras as Child René
 Santiago Emiliano as Child Alan
 Maribel Lancioni as Elisa
 Adanely Núñez as Gisela
 Eva Cedeño as Odette Córdova
 Abril Onyl as Olga
 Jonnathan Kuri as Flavio Maccari
 Juan Colucho as Gastón
 Sergio Zaldívar as Julio
 Marcus Ornellas as Ariel
 Fernando Orozco as Joel
 Jaime De Lara as Fabricio
 Natalia Ortega as Adriana
 Daniela Cordero as Almudena
 Estrella Martín as Triana
 Tania Riquenes as Débora

Soundtrack

Awards and nominations

References

External links 
 

Televisa telenovelas
Mexican telenovelas
2015 telenovelas
2015 Mexican television series debuts
2010s Mexican television series
2016 Mexican television series endings
Spanish-language telenovelas